William Hodgman (born December 14, 1952) is an American lawyer and prosecutor. He served as a prosecutor during the O. J. Simpson murder trial, a role in which he gained international attention. He also served as the Assistant District Attorney for line operations in the Los Angeles District Attorney's office.

Early life
Hodgman was born and raised in La Habra, California, a suburban community in southern California. He is the oldest of four children. He graduated from UCLA and then the University of California, Hastings College of the Law in 1978.

Career
Upon graduation from law school, Hodgman started his career as a junior prosecutor in the Los Angeles District Attorney's office. He was officially hired by Johnnie Cochran, who was the Assistant District Attorney of Los Angeles, at the time. In 1982, Hodgman left the Los Angeles District Attorney's office to work in private practice at a local law firm. However, after just one year, he returned to the District Attorney's office.

Hodgman was the lead attorney in the prosecution of Charles Keating, who was convicted for fraud. As a result of his work, he was awarded with the 1992 Outstanding Prosecutor of the Year by the California District Attorneys Association and the Los Angeles County Association of Deputy District Attorneys. In 1993, Hodgman led the investigation into the child sexual abuse accusations against Michael Jackson. 

Hodgman was assigned to be a co-prosecutor in the O.J. Simpson murder trial and was present during opening statements. However, during a meeting with other prosecutors, he began to suffer from chest pains and collapsed. Hodgman was rushed to the hospital and his condition was attributed to stress from his case. Testing at the hospital also revealed that he had a chronic heart defect. Hodgman did not return to the O.J. Simpson trial and was replaced by Chris Darden as the co-prosecutor.

Hodgman successfully prosecuted rapper Suge Knight for a probation violation in 1997.

Hodgman served as the Assistant District Attorney for line operations in the Los Angeles District Attorney's office until 2019 when he retired after 40 years working with the Los Angeles District Attorney's office.

In popular culture
Hodgman is played by Christian Clemenson in the 2016 television series The People v. O. J. Simpson: American Crime Story.

Personal life
Hodgman is married and has a son.

References

American prosecutors
1952 births
California lawyers
Living people
O. J. Simpson murder case
University of California, Los Angeles alumni
University of California, Hastings College of the Law alumni
20th-century American lawyers
21st-century American lawyers
People from La Habra, California